Sirgora is a census town in Chhindwara district in the Indian state of Madhya Pradesh.

Demographics
 India census, Sirgora had a population of 8,485. Males constitute 52% of the population and females 48%. Sirgora has an average literacy rate of 63%, higher than the national average of 59.5%: male literacy is 72%, and female literacy is 54%. In Sirgora, 14% of the population is under 6 years of age.

References

Cities and towns in Chhindwara district